Conrad O.Cist. was a pre-Reformation cleric who was appointed the Bishop of Sodor and Man in the early 15th century.

A Cistercian monk, he was appointed the Bishop of Sodor and Man by Pope Boniface IX on 9 January 1402. Conrad can have only served for a few months, because his successor Theodore Bloc was appointed on 16 April 1402.

See also 

 Conrad (Bishop of Utrecht)
 Conrad II, Bishop of Hildesheim

References 

 
 
 
 
 

15th-century English Roman Catholic bishops
Bishops of Sodor and Man
Year of birth unknown
Year of death unknown